This is the list of the appointed members of the European Parliament for Greece from 1 January 1981 until the (first) direct elections in October 1981. See 1981 European Parliament election in Greece for the results.

List

References

Greece
List
1981